Star Trek: The Next Generation is a widebody pinball game, designed by Steve Ritchie and released in November 1993 by Williams Electronics. It was part of WMS' SuperPin series (see also The Twilight Zone and Indiana Jones: The Pinball Adventure), and was based on the TV series. It is the only pinball machine that features three separate highscore-lists. Apart from the regular highscore-list and the buy-in-list, it also features a reminiscence to The Machine: Bride of Pin*Bot billionaires club. It is also the third pinball game overall based on the Star Trek franchise, following the 1979 pinball game by Bally, and the 1991 game by Data East (both based on the original series), and preceding the 2013 pinball game by Stern (based on the 2009 J. J. Abrams film).

Production notes

According to an interview, Steve Ritchie, a longtime Star Trek fan, stated that getting the license was a challenge, due to Paramount insisting that they don't want to put any violence in the game; however, he told them that he would never violate the Prime Directive.

Originally, the game was supposed to be based on the 1992 film, Under Siege.

The game uses the DCS Sound System and includes voice clips recorded by the cast of the television series, with:
Patrick Stewart as Captain Jean-Luc Picard
Jonathan Frakes as Commander William Riker
Brent Spiner as Lieutenant Commander Data
Gates McFadden as Dr. Beverly Crusher
Michael Dorn as Lieutenant Worf
Marina Sirtis as Counselor Deanna Troi
LeVar Burton as Lieutenant Commander Geordi La Forge 
Majel Barrett as the computer voice
John de Lancie as Q.

Launch options
When a new ball is launched into the plunger, the player is given one of five launch awards, which is selected when the ball is fired. Unless otherwise noted, the ball is launched through the spiral ramp and into the lock hole (above the pop bumpers). Another ball is popped from the left scoop and onto the left inlanes.
Start Mission: Starts lit mission.
Flipper Skill Shot: The player has to shoot the ball up the right ramp (the Beta Quadrant) for a random award.
Launch Probe: The ball will be loaded into one of the two cannons, located on top of the slings. Shoot the lit target for a random award. If the player misses, Data will say, "The probe has discovered nothing, sir".
Light Lock / Light Holodeck: Lights the ball lock, and the ball gets locked for multiball. When this option is selected twice, "Light Lock" changes to "Light Holodeck".
Warp Factor: Starts the ball at Warp Factor 4. After the player reaches Warp 9, (depending on the ROM version), the award changes to Warp 9.1, up to 9.9 (the player has only a limited amount of time to make either the left circle or Delta ramp for each point), then changes to "Warp Factor 2". The ball is sent to the pop bumpers.

Scoring and Game Modes 
There are several ways to score points outside of the missions as well as unlocking certain game modes.  The following modes are available:
 Explosive Millions - Shooting the Alpha Quadrant or Beta Quadrant ramps unlocks Explosive Millions.  Shooting the same or opposite ramp awards 5 million points, followed by 10 million for another shot, which compounds by 10 million every shot.  The player has ten seconds to hit the ramp to score or the mode ends.
 Bonus Multipliers - Hitting all three rollover lanes above the bumpers will increase the bonus multiplier for that ball. The first completion raises it to 2X, and subsequent steps raise it 2X at a time to a maximum of 10X.  When the 8X is achieved, the Extra Ball light is lit in the "Start Mission" pocket.  When the multiplier is maxed, completing the rollovers again awards 10 million, with the value increasing by 10 million every time afterward
 Holodeck - The player has two choices.  Score 25 million points, or play the "video mode" shuttle cavern.  If the player selects the video mode, the player has to go through the caverns in a shuttle, picking up 10 million point cards while avoiding mines and cavern walls.  There is an extra ball card somewhere in the caverns, as well as artifact (see below).  Reaching the Extra Ball is achieved by alternating Left, Left, Right, Right turns until cavern 7.  Depending on how many Extra Balls have already been earned and the games Extra Ball probability configuration it may end up either an Extra Ball or a 10 million point card.  Once an Extra Ball has been earned in the Holodeck all subsequent Holodeck runs will not award any Extra Balls, regardless of the path chosen.  Collecting the artifact, clearing all caverns, or crashing into a mine or wall immediately ends the video mode scoring the points collected in the mode. A maximum score of 159 million points is possible for a flawless run.

At the start of the Holodeck mode, pressing a flipper button along with pulling the launch trigger starts a "Riker's Poker Night" video mode.
 Kickback - Shooting the three left yellow targets lights Kickback, which saves the ball from draining from the left outlane.  If the game is in tournament mode this must initially be earned.  Otherwise the game starts out with the Kickback lit.  The Kickback can be recharged unlimited times by hitting the appropriate targets after it had been depleted. 
  Shuttles - Each shot to the Beta Quadrant ramp launches one shuttle. Awards such as Light Holodeck, Command Decision, and Light Extra Ball are given for reaching set numbers of shuttles. The ramp entrance is flanked by a pair of stand-up targets, either of which enables the ramp to award two shuttles for a few seconds when hit. If the player hits both targets and then shoots the ramp, four shuttles are awarded.

Once five extra balls are earned during game, for each one earned thereafter, points will be added.

"Missions" 
The game features seven "missions/episodes" the player must complete before entering The Final Frontier:
 Time Rift
 Worm Hole
 Search The Galaxy
 Battle Simulation
 Q's Challenge
 Rescue
 Asteroid Threat

There are various marked targets around the playfield with the Star Trek insignia. Different combinations of these are lit for different modes, indicating which shots the player needs to make. These modes are not stackable, meaning the player must complete one mission before starting another. There is a hole in the center at the top of the playfield labelled "Start Mission" which will start a mission at any time if the player makes the shot. In addition, hitting the lit "Command Decision" Target allows the player to select which mission to attempt, including already attempted missions (marked as "rerun" missions; varies from no allowable "reruns" to unlimited "reruns", depending on the machine's settings).

In all missions except Q's challenge, if the player fails to complete certain objectives by losing the ball to the drain, Data will say, "Had you projected the ball along the proper trajectory, you would have been rewarded."  Pressing both flippers during this line activates an Easter egg, in which Picard will interrupt Data and say, "Thank you, Mr. Data."  The Easter egg also adds 10 million points to the score.

"Artifacts"
Each Mission can award one or more "Artifacts", which add to the value and bonuses of the "Final Frontier" Mission. (Artifacts can also be earned during Warp Mode — see "Warp Factors" below - or in the Holodeck video mode.) These Artifacts are, in award order, Dilithium Crystals, an Isolinear Chip, a Duranium Sphere, and a Singing Stone. Once all four Artifacts are awarded, the order starts again with the Dilithium Crystals. Thus, multiples of each Artifact can be awarded. Every Artifact collected is worth 50 million points.

List of Missions
 Time Rift
All the signature targets are lit and worth 10 million points. Hitting the Time Rift targets to the left cause the count down timer to add time and the bonus amount to increase by 5 million. Both the time increases and the bonus amount top out once the bonus reaches 25 million; further hits add no extra time or score. Each time the target is hit, a different character speaks. One Artifact is awarded after hitting any 4 Rift Markers (duplicates count).

 Worm Hole
The left orbit, Beta Quadrant/Shuttle ramp, and Delta Quardant/Worm Hole ramp are lit. The goal is to shoot the Worm Hole ramp. This is facilitated by hitting the Shuttle ramp, which feeds the right flipper to shoot the left orbit, which feeds the upper right flipper to the Worm Hole ramp. Each completed Shuttle ramp shot increases the value of the Worm Hole target by 10 million, as does the left orbit spinner by 1 million per "spin". Failure to hit the Worm Hole ramp before time expires awards a flat 20 million. Completing the Worm Hole awards the accumulated points and an Artifact.

 Search The Galaxy
The three ramp targets light up. Riker tells the player to "set course for the Alpha Quadrant". Technically, the targets can be complete in any order, but if done in the order of Alpha, Beta, and Delta, the Neutral Zone target lights up as a fourth target and is considered the "Gamma Quadrant". After completing a target, Riker orders the player to set course for the next target not yet reached. Base award is 5 million; each Quadrant completed adds 10 million times the order hit. Completing the three Ramp Quadrants in any order awards one Artifact; completing in order AND getting the "Gamma Quadrant" awards a second Artifact and 40 million more points.

 Battle Simulation
A ball is loaded up in one of the cannons and the player must either shoot the Neutral Zone targets/hole or the Start Mission hole. The targets alternate, and if successful, another ball is loaded in the other cannon. If the player misses, then they must hit the ball into either of the targets or the Advance Rank hole in order to have another ball loaded into a cannon. Sometimes a player can hit the target of the Neutral Zone, get credit, but not actually sink the ball and have to recover from that. Completing the first 5 "Levels" awards an Artifact. If completed without "losing" the ball to the playfield, it activates a Level 6 which—if hit—awards an extra ball.

 Q's Challenge
Q shows up and greets Picard as he often does in the TV series, "Bonjour, mon Capitaine!". Picard responds, "Q, what are you doing here?" Q says, "Let's play a little game." As the ball is being served up to the left flipper, Riker replies, "Q, we don't have time for your games." A couple of the signature targets is lit. There is a tiny target in front of the foremost pop bumpers that has "Q" shown on it. Any time the player hits it, another target lights up. As the player hits targets, others light up. Each completed target awards 10 million times the order hit. Each target also has a time out, where it will fade after a given time period. Completing five Q targets awards an Artifact. If the player drains the ball through the outlanes, or does hit the proper targets, there are several cracks that Q will make:
 "Someday you'll learn to play pinball."
 "And you were doing so well."
 "Pity."
 "Is that the best you can do?"
 "OK, that's enough."
 "Congratulations!"
 "Not bad, not bad at all."
 "Now, try this!"

 Rescue
The goal is to rescue 50 Starfleet personnel. The Alpha ramp, Start Mission, and shuttle ramp targets light up. Any targets on the playfield that get hit cause personnel to be loaded onto the shuttle. Hitting either the Alpha ramp or the shuttle ramp will rescue the personnel currently loaded. When the player hits the Start Mission target, Riker says, "Five to beam up", and an animated graphic plays showing five personnel being rescued. When the player has hit enough targets that there are no more personnel to load, the computer voice instructs the player to board the shuttle at once. Getting 25 personnel to "safety" (either aboard the shuttle OR beamed up) awards one Artifact; saving all 50 awards a second Artifact.

 Asteroid Threat
The Start Mission shot lights up as a hurry-up value begins to count down from 20 million and the ship enters an asteroid field. Hitting the shot awards the points, destroys an asteroid, and starts a 30-second timer with all seven major shots lit for the same value. If the countdown reaches 5 million, the asteroid explodes on its own and the timer begins to run with all shots set at 5 million. Each shot destroys another asteroid and goes out of play after being hit. One artifact is awarded for destroying a total of four asteroids, including the one in the initial hurry-up; a second one is given for making every shot before time runs out.

 The Final Frontier (Wizard Mode)
After completing all the other missions, Final Frontier can be started by shooting Start Mission or choosing it in a Command Decision. The player receives 100 million points for each individual artifact collected, and an additional billion points for each complete set of four. All six balls are put into play, with the first two fired by the player from the cannons and the other four being auto-plunged. Every major shot is lit, awarding 25 million points times the number of artifacts collected (to a maximum of 250 million), or 10 million if the player has no artifacts. This mode continues until five balls have drained.

Warp Factors
The Warp Factor is lit at the right inlane, and it is collected by shooting the left loop. The left loop must be completed to be advanced. It is also advanced by shooting the Delta Quadrant (left ramp), but only during the first series of increases to Warp 9. The Warp Factor awards are as follows:
Warp Factor 2: 5 million points.
Warp Factor 3: Million Jets Are Lit. Each pop bumper hit is worth 1 million points in addition to increasing the Borg Jackpot (see below).
Warp Factor 4: Spinner Is Lit. Each turn of the spinner target has its value multiplied by 100 (from 1,000 to 100,000, for example). This increase is not cumulative (not earned again if WF4 is hit again on the same ball), and is lost on each ball drain.
Warp Factor 5: Multipliers Are Held. The player's bonus multiplier at the end of the current ball is carried over to the start of the next one.
Warp Factor 6: Return Lanes Are Lit. The left inlane starts Hurry Up, a bonus score that counts down from 50 million points to 10 million points, and is collected by shooting the right loop. The right inlane starts Super Spinner, in which the spinner awards 10 million points per spin for a limited time; rolling the ball through the inlane again resets the timer.
Warp Factor 7: Double Spinner. This doubles the base value for each turn of the spinner; maxing at 255,000 points [25,500,000 if Warp Factor 4 is active].
Warp Factor 8: Extra Ball Lit. This award is collected by shooting the Start Mission Scoop.
Warp Factor 9: Starts Warp Factor 9 mode. The goal in this mode is to shoot the left loop and/or the Delta Quadrant to advance the level in increments of 0.1 (Warp 9.1, Warp 9.2, etc.), until the engine maxes out at Warp Factor 9.9. Each increment awards points, starting at 20 million with Warp 9.1, and increasing 5 million per increment, maxing out at 60 million points once Warp 9.9 is reached. The player has 10 seconds to make each shot, as counted down by Geordi La Forge. This mode ends when the player drains the ball, fails to make a shot before time runs out, or reaches Warp 9.9; afterward, the warp factor resets to 1.

If the player chooses the "Warp Factor 4" option before plunging the ball, the awards for Warp Factors 2, 3, and 4 all go into effect.

Once Warp Factor 9 mode has been played for the first time, the following changes go into effect:

 The "Warp Factor 4" plunger option changes to "Warp Factor 2," awarding 5 million if chosen.
 Reaching Warp Factor 8 awards an artifact (see "Missions" above) instead of lighting an extra ball.
 The left ramp no longer advances the warp factor, but does remain in play for Warp Factor 9 mode.

Neutral Zone
Three targets plus a hole in front of the middle one. Shoot the targets three times to light one of the following three missions at random (announced by Worf), then shoot the hole to start it.
 Ferengi: A multiball that starts with two balls in play. Each shot to the Neutral Zone within the first 10 seconds adds one ball, to a maximum of four. The Start Mission scoop awards a jackpot that starts at 10 million times the number of balls in play, and every hit to the left bank of stand-up targets adds 2 million to the jackpot to a maximum of 70 million.
 Romulan: Three Romulan Warbirds will appear (left orbit, Alpha Quadrant ramp and Beta Quadrant ramp) which the player can force to cloak by shooting the corresponding shot. The mission goal is to cloak all ships simultaneously for a 30 million award. Hitting any of the righthand "Klingon Assistance" targets brings a Klingon Bird-of-prey out of cloak, thus blocking one of the Warbirds (first hit blocks the left orbit ship, second the Beta Quadrant ramp ship; the Alpha Quadrant ramp is never "blocked") and expediting completion of the goal.
 Cardassian: A two-ball multiball in which a jackpot can be collected by shooting any Neutral Zone target. The value of the jackpot depends on the shield strength of the Enterprise as follows:
Shields at 100%: 50 Million
Shields at 83%: 30 Million
Shields at 66%: 25 Million
Shields at 50%: 20 Million
Shields at 33%: 15 Million
Shields at 17%: 10 Million
Shields at 0%: 5 Million
During this mission, a Cardassian ship occasionally fires at the Enterprise, damaging its shields and reducing the jackpot. As with Borg Multiball (see below), shots to the spinner repair the shields and raise the jackpot.

Borg Multiball
All hits of the upper playfield pop bumpers increase the base "Borg Jackpot" amount awarded in Borg Multiball mode. To start the mode, and thus the battle with the Borg ship, the player needs to lock three balls. Locks are lit by shooting the right orbit (or selecting "Light Lock" on the start of a ball). Then shoot the right orbit again (or — if either or both are lit — the Delta Quadrant ramp or the Neutral Zone) to lock a ball.  The player will then either hear the Borg tell Picard, "If you do not surrender now, you will be destroyed!", or, Picard will announce, "Send to Starfleet: we have engaged the Borg!"

After locking the third ball, Multiball will start with one ball placed into the left cannon and the "Start Mission" hole lit. Shooting the hole damages the Borg Ship and scores the Jackpot.  A second hit will score a Double Jackpot, and a third hit destroys the Borg ship and scores the Triple Jackpot.  In addition, each cannon shot in the "Start Mission" hole adds 10 million points to the Jackpot.  After a Triple Jackpot, levels reset to Single Jackpot, allowing for multiple Triple Jackpots.

The full Multiball mode will start as soon as the player misses a cannon shot or after scoring the Triple Jackpot from the cannon shot, where Picard will call out All hands, prepare for Multiball! During Multiball, "Start Mission" will score cycling Jackpot/Double Jackpot/Triple Jackpot and the left ramp a Triple Jackpot. As the Enterprise is being shot at by the Borg, the "Shields" will drop in strength (from one to three units as with the Cardassian Neutral Zone Mission above). "Start Mission" Jackpots will be unlit as soon as the Shields reach 0%. By hitting the spinner in the left orbit, the shields are rebuilt and the "Start Mission" Jackpot is reactivated.

If a player scores a Triple Jackpot from the Delta Quadrant ramp, the Borg will automatically open fire on the Enterprise and the ball will shoot out of the Borg ship.  Any jackpots scored through the "Start Mission" pocket will remain claimed, i.e. if the player has scored a Jackpot and a Double Jackpot, and scores a Triple Jackpot via the Delta Quadrant ramp, sinking the ball through the "Start Mission" pocket will award a Triple Jackpot.

Should the player score at least one Triple Jackpot during the multiball, at the end of the game during the Match Game, the player will hear this dialogue from Picard: "Captain's Log, supplemental: The crew performed admirably in dispatching the Borg threat."

Ranks
Light all three multiplier lanes (above the jet bumpers) to advance bonus and light Advance in Rank at the upper left sinkhole. Ranks add to the end-of-ball bonus count as follows:
 Ensign: 5 million (player starts the game with this rank)
 Lieutenant: 10 million
 Lieutenant Commander: 15 million
 Commander: 20 million
 Captain: 25 million
Once the player reaches Captain, a successful Advance in Rank shot awards an immediate 100 million.

High Score Lists
Star Trek: The Next Generation is the only pinball machine to feature three separate high score lists. At the end of a game, the player may receive a "buy-in" extra ball in exchange for one credit, either by inserting coins or by using a credit already on the machine. The maximum number of buy-ins per game can be set by the machine operator.

The high scores are classified as follows:

Honor Roll: The highest scores with no more than one buy-in.
Officer's Club: The highest scores with two or more buy-ins.
Q Continuum: Scores of 10 billion or higher, with any number of buy-ins.
Grand Champion: Highest score of all with no more than one buy-in; separate from the other lists.

If a player makes the Officer's Club or Honor Roll, or is Grand Champion, Worf will say, "You are an honorable player!"

Digital version
Star Trek: The Next Generation pinball was available as a licensed machine of The Pinball Arcade for several platforms. (No longer available as of June 30, 2018.)  

An unlicensed version is also available for Visual Pinball.

References

External links
IPDB entry for Star Trek: The Next Generation
TNG Pinball Notes from the Pinball Archive
Star Trek TNG technical help article

Pinball machines based on Star Trek
Williams pinball machines
Star Trek: The Next Generation
1993 pinball machines
Television
Pinball machines based on television series